Events from the year 1823 in Canada.

Incumbents
Monarch: George IV

Federal government
Parliament of Lower Canada: 11th 
Parliament of Upper Canada: 8th

Governors
Governor of the Canadas: Robert Milnes
Governor of New Brunswick: George Stracey Smyth
Governor of Nova Scotia: John Coape Sherbrooke
Commodore-Governor of Newfoundland: Richard Goodwin Keats
Governor of Prince Edward Island: Charles Douglass Smith

Events
May 10 – Louis-Joseph Papineau and John Neilson are in London to present a petition of 60,000 signatures against favouring Union of the colonies
October 14 – At a meeting, in Montreal, Mr. (afterwards Sir) James Stuart favors Union.

Full date unknown
Shanawdithit, the last known Beothuk is found
British expedition up the St. Clair River; site of Corunna surveyed as a potential capital for Upper Canada
Smiths Falls, Ontario is founded
Ward Chipman replaces George Stracey Smyth as Governor of New Brunswick
Peter Robinson organizes land settlements of Irish Catholics to Carelton and Lanark County, Ontario

Arts and literature

New Books
A General Description of Nova Scotia, Thomas Chandler Haliburton his first work
James Fenimore Cooper's first volume of his Leatherstocking series published in United States.

Births
February 24 – William Murdoch, poet (died 1887)
March 30 – James Cox Aikins, politician, Minister and Lieutenant-Governor of Manitoba (died 1904)
April 29 – Hart Massey, businessman and philanthropist (died 1896)
June 2 – Gédéon Ouimet, politician and 2nd Premier of Quebec (died 1905)

June 13 – David Breakenridge Read, lawyer and 14th Mayor of Toronto (died 1904)
June 17 – Henri Faraud, Roman Catholic bishop (died 1890)
July 23 – Alexandre-Antonin Taché, Roman Catholic priest, missionary, author and Archbishop (died 1894)
August 13 – Goldwin Smith, historian and journalist (died 1910)
October 16 – Marc-Aurèle Plamondon, lawyer, journalist, publisher, and judge (died 1900)
November 10 – Thomas Arkell, politician, farmer and grain merchant (died 1906)
December 27 – Mackenzie Bowell, politician and 5th Prime Minister of Canada, Born in Rickinghall, England.  (died 1917)

Deaths

References 

 
Canada
Years of the 19th century in Canada
1823 in North America